Cacopsylla mali is a species of insect belonging to the family Psyllidae.

It is native to Eurasia and Northern America.

References

Psyllidae